Nash Motors Company was an American automobile manufacturer based in Kenosha, Wisconsin from 1916 until 1937. From 1937 through 1954, Nash Motors was the automotive division of the Nash-Kelvinator Corporation. As sales of smaller firms declined after 1950 in the wake of the domestic Big Three automakers (General Motors, Ford, and Chrysler) advantages in production, distribution, and revenue, Nash merged with Hudson Motors to form American Motors Corporation (AMC). Nash automobile production continued from 1954 through 1957 under AMC.

Innovations by Nash included the 1938 introduction of an automobile heating and ventilation system which is still used today, unibody construction in 1941, seat belts in 1950, a US-built compact car in 1950, and an early muscle car in 1957.

History 

Nash Motors was founded in 1916 by former General Motors president Charles W. Nash, who acquired the Thomas B. Jeffery Company. Jeffery's best-known automobile was the Rambler whose mass production from a plant in Kenosha began in 1902.

The 1917 Nash Model 671 was the first vehicle produced to bear the name of the new company's founder. Sales were positive for 1918 at 10,283 units. More models were added in 1919 and sales rose to 27,081 for the year.

Nash enjoyed decades of success by focusing its efforts to build cars "embodying honest worth [at] a price level which held out possibilities of a very wide market."

The four-wheel drive Jeffery Quad truck became an important product for Nash. Approximately 11,500 Quads were built between 1913 and 1919. They served to move material during World War I under severe conditions. The Quad used Mehul differentials with half-shafts mounted above the load-bearing dead axles to drive the hubs through hub-reduction gearing. In addition, it featured four-wheel steering. The Quad achieved the reputation of being the best four-wheel drive truck produced in the country. The newly formed Nash Motors became the largest producer of four-wheel drives. By 1918, capacity constraints at Nash meant the Paige-Detroit Motor Car Company began to assemble the Nash Quad under license and Nash patents. Nash became the leading producer of military trucks by the end of World War I. After the war ended, surplus Quads were used as heavy work trucks in fields such as construction and logging.

Charles Nash convinced the chief engineer of GM's Oakland Division, Finnish-born Nils Eric Wahlberg, to move to Nash's new company. The first Nash engine introduced in 1917 by Wahlberg had overhead valves., which Nash had learned about while working for Buick. Wahlberg is also credited with helping to design flow-through ventilation that is used today in nearly every motor vehicle.

Introduced in 1938, Nash's Weather Eye directed fresh, outside air into the car's fan-boosted, filtered ventilation system, where it was warmed (or cooled), and then removed through rearward placed vents. The process also helped to reduce humidity and equalize the slight pressure differential between the outside and inside of a moving vehicle.

Another unique feature of Nash cars was the unequal wheel tracks. The front wheels were set slightly narrower than the rear, thus adding stability and improving cornering. Wahlberg was also an early proponent of wind tunnel testing for vehicles and during World War II worked with Theodore (Ted) Ulrich in the development of Nash's radically styled Airflyte models.

Nash's slogan from the late 1920s and 1930s was "Give the customer more than he has paid for" and the cars lived up to it. Innovations included a straight-eight engine with overhead valves, twin spark plugs, and nine crankshaft bearings in 1930. The 1932 Ambassador Eight had synchromesh transmissions and free wheeling, automatic centralized chassis lubrication, a worm-drive rear end, and its suspension was adjustable inside the car. A long-time proponent of automotive safety, Nash was among the early mid- and low-priced cars to offer four-wheel brakes.

The Nash was a success among consumers that meant for the company "selling for a long time has been 100% a production problem... month after month all the cars that could be produced were sold before they left the factory floor."

Development of the Ajax
For the 1925 model year, Nash introduced the entry-level marque Ajax. The Ajax was produced in the newly acquired Mitchell Motor Car Company plant in Racine, Wisconsin. Mitchell was the manufacturer of Mitchell-brand automobiles between 1903 and 1923. Sales of Ajax automobiles, while quite respectable, were disappointing. It was believed that the same car would sell better if it were called a Nash. Thus the Ajax became the "Nash Light Six" in June 1926 and sales did improve, just as expected. 

In an unusual move, Nash Motors offered all Ajax owners a kit to "convert" their Ajax into a Nash Light Six. This kit, supplied at no charge, included a set of new hubcaps, a radiator badge, and all other parts necessary to change the identity of an Ajax into that of a Nash Light Six. This was done to protect Ajax owners from the inevitable drop in resale value when the Ajax marque was discontinued. In this way Nash Motors showed the high value they placed upon their customers' satisfaction and well-being. Most Ajax owners took advantage of this move, and "unconverted" Ajax cars are quite rare today.

Acquisition of LaFayette
Nash was the principal stockholder in LaFayette Motors, a company started in Indianapolis, Indiana, in 1920, and later moved to Milwaukee, Wisconsin, and the producer of a large, powerful, and expensive luxury car. Other major stockholders were Charles W. Nash and his friends and business associates. The LaFayette cars did not sell well.

In 1924, Nash absorbed LaFayette and converted its plant to produce Ajax automobiles. The LaFayette marque was reintroduced in 1934 as a lower-priced companion to Nash. LaFayette ceased to be an independent marque with the introduction of the 1937 models. From 1937 through 1940, the Nash LaFayette was the lowest-priced model and it was replaced by the new unibody Nash 600 for the 1941 model year.

Era of George Mason and Nash Kelvinator

Before retiring, Charles Nash chose Kelvinator Corporation head George W. Mason to succeed him. Mason accepted, but placed one condition on the job: Nash would acquire controlling interest in Kelvinator, which at the time was the leading manufacturer of high-end refrigerators and kitchen appliances in the United States. The resulting company, as of January 4, 1937, was known as Nash-Kelvinator. Nash as a brand name continued to represent automobiles for the merged firm. This was the largest merger of companies not in the same industry up until that time.

In 1938, Nash introduced an optional conditioned air heating/ventilating system, an outcome of the expertise shared between Kelvinator and Nash. This was the first hot-water car heater to draw fresh air from outside the car, and is the basis of all modern internal combustion engine car heaters in use today. Also in 1938, Nash, along with other car manufacturers Studebaker and Graham, offered vacuum-controlled shifting, an early approach to removing the gearshift from the front floorboards. Automobiles equipped with the Automatic Vacuum Shift (supplied by the Evans Products Company) had a small gear selector lever mounted on the dashboard, immediately below the radio controls.

In 1936, Nash introduced the "Bed-In-A-Car" feature, which allowed the car's interior to be converted into a sleeping compartment. The rear seatbacks hinged up, allowing the rear seat cushion to be propped up into a level position. This also created an opening between the passenger compartment and the trunk. Two adults could sleep in the car, with their legs and feet in the trunk, and their heads and shoulders on the rear seat cushions. In 1949, this arrangement was modified so that fully reclining front seatbacks created a sleeping area entirely within the passenger compartment. In 1950 these reclining seatbacks were given the ability to lock into several intermediate positions. Nash soon called these "Airliner Reclining Seats".

In 1939, Nash added a thermostat to its "Conditioned Air System", and thus the famous Nash Weather Eye heater was introduced. The 1939 and 1940 Nash streamlined cars were designed by George Walker and Associates and freelance body stylist Don Mortrude. They were available in three series - LaFayette, Ambassador Six, and Ambassador Eight. For the 1940 model cars, Nash introduced independent coil spring front suspension and sealed beam headlights.

Introduced for the 1941 model year, the Nash 600 was the first mass-produced unibody construction automobile made in the United States. Its lighter weight compared to body-on-frame automobiles and lower air drag helped it to achieve excellent fuel economy for its day. The "600" model designation is said to have been derived from overdrive-equipped examples of this car's ability to travel  on a  tank of gasoline. It would achieve . The 600 models used an unusual steering/front suspension system with extremely long kingpins. Inadequate lubrication became a problem for these systems, commonly resulting in premature failures. The design of the cars was improved by new front ends, upholstery, and chrome trim from 1942 through 1948. The larger Ambassador models shared the same bodies with the 600 but placed this unibody structure on top of a conventional frame, resulting in an extremely strong design.

Post-World War II passenger car production resumed on October 27, 1945, with an Ambassador sedan first off the assembly line. There were few changes from 1942 models, most noticeable were longer and slimmer upper grille bars and a projecting center section on the lower grille. The 600 models featured a conventional front suspension and steering system. Postwar Nashes were six-cylinder only; eight-cylinder engines did not return. The large Ambassador engine thus was the seven main bearing, overhead-valve, six-cylinder developing .

Nash was considering the potential of offering a pickup truck and developed a prototype built on the existing chassis with a modified 600 front end and cab along with an outsourced cargo bed. For the 1946 model year, Nash introduced the Suburban model that used wood framing and panels on the body. It was similar to the Chrysler Town and Country and Ford Sportsman models. Suburbans were continued in 1947 and 1948 models with 1,000 built over the three years. In 1948, the Ambassador convertible returned with 1,000 built.

Introduction of the Nash Airflyte

The aerodynamic 1949 Nash "Airflyte" was the first car of an advanced design introduced by the company after the war. Its aerodynamic body shape was developed in a wind tunnel. A "radically aerodynamic" design was first proposed around 1943 by two independent designers, Ted Pietsch and Bob Koto, to Nash's Vice President of Engineering, Nils E. Wahlberg. The resulting all-new 1949 production cars were similar to the proposed sketches. The objective was to reduce the automobile's body's drag coefficient by using a smooth shape and enclosed front fenders. Closed fenders were conceived by Nash engineers also in the exploration for added strength of unibody construction, whereas Hudson, a close competitor incorporated an actual unibody frame section into its closed rear wheel openings at about the same time. The "cutting-edge aerodynamics" of the all-new postwar design were the most "alarming" in the industry since the Chrysler Airflow. It was built at one of two new factories in El Segundo, California, where the factory is still being used, having been re-purposed as the Boeing Satellite Development Center, immediately south of Los Angeles International Airport, on Nash Street.

A one-piece curved safety glass windshield was used on both models. Wide and low, the automobile featured more interior room than its 1948 predecessor although its height was 6 inches less. Due to its enclosed front fenders, Nash automobiles had a larger turning radius than most other cars. Both shared the same bodies. Coil springs were used on all four wheels. Three trim lines were offered in both models; Super, Super Special, and the top line Custom.

In 1949, Nash became the first American car with seat belts as a factory option. They were installed in 40,000 cars, yet buyers did not want them and had dealers remove them. There was "heated debate despite increasing scientific research" about their value and the option was "met with insurmountable sales resistance" with Nash reporting that after one year "only 1,000 had been used" by customers.

The few changes for the 1950 Airflytes were a wider rear window, concealed fuel filler cap, some dashboard features, and the addition on Ambassadors of a GM Hydramatic automatic transmission option. The 600 models were renamed the "Statesman". A five-position Airliner reclining front passenger seatback was optional in both models.

Changes for the 1951 model Airflytes were to the rear fenders, elongated to incorporate vertical taillights, a new conventional dashboard replacing the Uniscope mounted on the steering column and a new vertical bar grille with horizontal parking lights as well as the addition of GM Hydramatic as a Statesman option. The three best sales years for Nash up to that time were 1949, 1950, and 1951.

Nash-Kelvinator's President George Mason felt Nash had the best chance of reaching a larger market by building small cars. He directed Nash towards the development of the first compact of the post-war era, the 1950 Nash Rambler, which was marketed as an up-market, feature-laden convertible. Mason orchestrated a contract manufacturing arrangement with Austin of the UK to build Nash's new subcompact car, the Metropolitan, it was introduced in March as a 1954 model.

The full-size Nash Airflytes were completely re-designed for the 1952 model year and were promoted as the Golden Airflytes, in honor of Nash Motors' 50th anniversary as an automobile builder as the company was counting the years of the Thomas B. Jeffery Company as part of their own heritage. Therefore, "Great Cars Since 1902" became one of the company's advertising slogans. Nash was the only American car manufacturer to introduce an all-new 1952 model other than Ford Motor Company. 

The new Golden Airflytes presented a more modern, squared-off look than did the 1949 through 1951 models, which were often compared to inverted bathtubs. Battista "Pinin" Farina of Italy was contracted by Nash to design a body for the new Golden Airflyte. Management was unhappy with the design and the result was a combination of an in-house design and Pinin Farina's model. Also in 1952, Nash began offering automatic transmissions, either a GM Hydramatic or a Borg-Warner overdrive transmission.

Using its Kelvinator refrigeration experience, the automobile industry's first single-unit heating and air conditioning system was introduced by Nash in 1954. This was a compact, affordable system for the mass market with controls on the dash and an electric clutch. Entirely incorporated within the engine bay, the combined heating and cooling system had cold air for passengers enter through dash-mounted vents. Competing systems used a separate heating system and an engine-mounted compressor with an evaporator in the car's trunk to deliver cold air through the rear package shelf and overhead vents. The alternative layout pioneered by Nash "became established practice and continues to form the basis of the modern and more sophisticated automatic climate control systems."

Introduction of the Nash-Healey

The Anglo-American Nash-Healey sports car was introduced in 1951. This was a collaborative effort between George Mason and British sports car manufacturer Donald Healey. Healey designed and built the chassis and suspension and also, until 1952, the aluminum body which another British manufacturer, Panelcraft Sheet Metal Co. Ltd., fabricated in Birmingham West Midlands. Nash shipped the powertrain components to England and Healey assembled the cars, which were then shipped to the U.S. for sale. In 1952 the Italian designer Battista Farina restyled the body, and its construction changed to steel and aluminum. High costs, low sales, and Nash's focus on the Rambler line led to the termination of Nash-Healey's production in 1954 after 506 automobiles had been produced.

The Nash-Healey, while a welcome attempt to improve Nash's stodgy image, did little to improve showroom traffic as Nash sales fell steadily from 1951 onward. The Airflyte had initially sold well in the postwar "seller's" market, but its bulbous styling, rooted in 1940s design trends, quickly became passé and its underpowered six-cylinder engine proved a major liability against GM's new OHV short-stroke V8s. Like fellow independents Hudson, Studebaker, and Packard, Nash charged higher prices for their cars than Ford and GM which benefitted from the volume of scale, but lacked the large dealer network or advertising budget of the Big Three. Low-profit Rambler sales gradually made up more and more of Nash's total volume. In 1953 and 1954, Ford and GM also waged an all-out price war on each other which further damaged the independents' sales. Mainline Nashes also lacked body styles; despite the introduction of a hardtop coupe in 1952, there was no convertible or station wagon although Rambler featured all of these.

In addition, while Nash had profited from military contracts during the Korean War, that conflict ended in mid-1953. At the same time, the new Secretary of Defense Charles E. Wilson, ex-GM president, began steering defense contracts to his former employer at the expense of the rest of the automotive industry.

Mason commissioned Farina to design a Rambler-based two-seater coupe called the Palm Beach, which may have been intended as a successor to the Nash-Healey. However, the project did not progress beyond a concept car.

For European endurance racing Healey and his staff designed and built three special Nash-Healeys with lightweight aluminum racing bodies. These competition versions entered four consecutive Le Mans races and one Mille Miglia.
At Le Mans they achieved fourth overall in 1950, sixth overall and fourth in class in 1951, third overall and first in class in 1952, and eleventh overall in 1953. In the Mille Miglia, they finished ninth overall in 1950 and seventh overall, fourth in class, in 1952.

Formation of American Motors Corporation

In January 1954, Nash announced the acquisition of the Hudson Motor Car Company as a friendly merger, creating American Motors Corporation (AMC). To improve the financial performance of the combined companies, all production beginning with the 1955 Nash and Hudson models would happen at Nash's Kenosha plant. Nash would focus most of its marketing resources on its smaller Rambler models, and Hudson would focus its marketing efforts on its full-sized cars.

One of the first things Mason did as CEO of the new company was to initiate talks with James J. Nance, president of Packard, for parts-sharing arrangements between AMC and Packard. At this time AMC did not have its own V8 engine and an agreement was made for the new  Packard V8 engine and Packard's Ultramatic automatic transmission to be used in the 1955 Nash Ambassador and Hudson Hornet models.

In July 1954, Packard acquired Studebaker to form Studebaker-Packard Corporation, however, further talks of a merger between AMC and Packard-Studebaker were cut short when Mason died on 8 October 1954. A week after his death, Mason's successor, George W. Romney, announced "there are no mergers under way either directly or indirectly". Nevertheless, Romney continued with Mason's commitment to buy components from Studebaker-Packard Corporation. Although Mason and Nance had previously agreed that Studebaker-Packard would purchase parts from AMC, it did not do so. Moreover, Packard's engines and transmissions were comparatively expensive, so AMC began development of its own V8 engine, and replaced the outsourced unit by mid-1956.

The 1955 model year, all the large Nash and Hudson automobiles were based on a Nash-derived shared common unitized body shell using styling themes by Pinin Farina, Edmund E. Anderson, and Frank Spring. Each had individual powertrains and separate, non-interchangeable body parts. This mimicked the longtime practice Big Three (General Motors, Ford, and Chrysler) that allowed for maximum manufacturing economy. Anderson set up separate design studios for Nash, Hudson, and Rambler.

George Romney ordered the removal of the front fender skirts on Nashes and Ramblers for the 1955 models. This feature was disliked by customers, yet reportedly were demanded by George Mason, who liked the appearance of them.

Even with the merger forming AMC, they were held to a total of about four percent of the market and thus were under pressure to lower expenses and tooling costs for new models, perhaps by innovation.

The Nash Metropolitan, which had been marketed under either the Nash or Hudson brands, became a make unto its own in 1957, as did the Rambler. By this point, Rambler sales made up the vast majority of AMC's volume, so George Romney decided to phase out the Nash and Hudson nameplates and focus solely on Rambler. This move would pay off the following year when an economic recession struck the United States and created a strong demand for economical compact cars. Nash and Hudson production ended with the last Hornet made on June 25, 1957. From 1958 until 1962, Rambler and the Metropolitan were the only brands of cars sold by AMC. By 1965, the Rambler name would begin to be phased out and AMC would take over as the brand name until the 1988 model year.

In 1970, American Motors acquired Kaiser Jeep (the descendant of Willys-Overland Motors) and its Toledo, Ohio, based manufacturing facilities. In 1979, AMC entered into a technology partnership with Renault. In 1987, Chrysler Corporation made a public offering to acquire all shares of AMC on the NYSE. The shareholders approved the offer and AMC became a division of Chrysler Corporation.

International markets
Since the early days, Nash vehicles were exported as complete cars or in knock-down kit form for local assembly to many countries around the world including right-hand-drive markets such as the United Kingdom, Australia, New Zealand, and South Africa. International production for both the Nash and Hudson marques was consolidated after the merger of Nash and Hudson to form American Motors Corporation (AMC) in 1954 after which operations thereafter were conducted at the former Nash plant in Kenosha and at the Brampton plant in Canada until 1957 when both the Nash and Hudson marques were retired.

Australia
A number of distributors for each of the Australian states built and sold Nash vehicles beginning in the 1920s. As was the practice for all car brands during the early 20th Century, the chassis and engines were imported and the bodies were locally built by Australian coach builders. Early distributors were Wilsford Limited for New South Wales, Richards Brothers for Victoria and the Riverina, Peels Limited for Queensland, Eric Madren Motors (later Nash Cars (W.A) Limited) for Western Australia, and Northern Motors for Tasmania. The recovery period following the end of World War II saw a lull in car manufacturing, petrol rationing, and currency shortages. Despite these factors, some cars were imported in the late 1940s and the 1950s. In 1950, a small number of Nash trucks were assembled by Davies Pty Ltd in Launceston, Tasmania.

After the Nash-Hudson merger in 1954, AMC's new Rambler vehicles were imported into Australia and distributed by Ira L. & A.C Berk Pty Ltd which had previously held the Hudson franchise since 1939. As Hudson was the more recognized brand in Australia they were initially sold as Hudson. The Nash Metropolitan was not sold in Australia. The first Rambler-badged vehicles were imported in 1957. This first shipment consisted of 24 vehicles, 10 of which were Rambler station wagons. Small numbers of Rambler Sixes were imported into Australia up until 1960. AMC made a new deal with Port Melbourne vehicle assembler Australian Motor Industries (AMI) in 1960 to build AMC vehicles from knock-down kits, production of which ran from 1961 until 1976. AMI eventually became Toyota Australia.

New Zealand
From 1935 Nash motor vehicles were assembled in New Zealand by Christchurch company Motor Assemblies Limited. The plant also made Studebaker and Standard vehicles and was acquired by Standard Motors in 1954. Production was then moved to Auckland company VW Motors at their Volkswagen plant in Otahuhu, Auckland until 1962. New Zealand saw the Nash Ramblers and the British-built, right-hand-drive Nash Metropolitan. In 1963 AMC struck a deal with Thames company Campbell Motors to build a new vehicle assembly plant for AMC vehicles which began production in 1964. Renamed Campbell Motor Industries (CMI) the plant built Rambler vehicles from knock-down kits until 1971. CMI eventually became Toyota New Zealand.

South Africa
Following World War II, Nash motor vehicles were assembled in South Africa by a newly built assembly operation in East London Car Distributors and Assemblers (CDA). The plant also built Packard, Renault, and Standard motor vehicles. CDA was eventually taken over, firstly by Chrysler, and finally by Peugeot.

United Kingdom
Nash vehicles were imported into the United Kingdom by London company Nash Concessionaires. After 1961, Rambler imports switched to the former U.K Hudson operation in Chiswick which was accordingly renamed Rambler Motors (A.M.C.) Limited. AMC's deal with Austin for the production of the Nash Metropolitan was independent of the Chiswick Rambler operation.

Gallery

Nash automobile brands 
 LaFayette
 Ajax
 Rambler
 Nash-Healey
 Jeffery

Nash automobiles 
 Nash 600
 Nash Statesman
 Ambassador
 Metropolitan
 Nash-Healey - cooperation with Donald Healey, assembled in the UK and Italy
 Nash Rambler
 Rambler

Motorsport
Like most American manufacturers of the fifties, Nash was a participant in the Grand National Stock Car series.

See also

 Pratt & Whitney R-2800 Double Wasp, Nash built during WWII

References
Inline

General

External links

 Nash Car Club of America (NCCA)
 Nash Healy History
 
 The Nordic Nash Register
 Allpar "Nash Engines" by Jim Dworschack and Jerry Knutsen

 
Defunct motor vehicle manufacturers of the United States
American Motors
Motor vehicle manufacturers based in Wisconsin
Kenosha, Wisconsin
1910s cars
1920s cars
1930s cars
1940s cars
1950s cars
Defunct manufacturing companies based in Wisconsin
Former components of the Dow Jones Industrial Average
1916 establishments in Wisconsin
1954 disestablishments in Wisconsin
Vehicle manufacturing companies established in 1916
Vehicle manufacturing companies disestablished in 1954
Defunct brands
Luxury motor vehicle manufacturers
Vintage vehicles
Pre-war vehicles
Cars introduced in 1917